Title 22 of the United States Code outlines the role of foreign relations and intercourse in the United States Code.

 —Diplomatic and Consular Service Generally
 —Consular Courts
 —United States Court for China
 —Passports
 —Preservation of Friendly Foreign Relations Generally
 —Foreign Diplomatic and Consular Officers
 —International Bureaus, Congresses, Etc.
 —Foreign Service Buildings
 —Foreign Wars, War Materials, and Neutrality
 —Hemispheral Relations
 —Foreign Agents and Propaganda
 —Claims Commissions
 —Service Courts of Friendly Foreign Forces
 —Foreign Service
 —Foreign Service Information Officers Corps
 —The Republic of the Philippines
 —Greek and Turkish Assistance
 —Relief Aid to War-Devastated Countries
 —United States Information and Educational Exchange Programs
 —Foreign Assistance Program
 —Mutual Defense Assistance Program
 —Mutual Defense Assistance Control Program
 —Settlement of International Claims
 —Settlement of Investment Disputes
 —Mutual Security Assistance
 —Protection of Citizens Abroad
 —Mutual Security Program
 —Middle East Peace and Stability
 —Protection of Vessels on the High Seas and in Territorial Waters of Foreign Countries
 —Armed Forces Participation in International Amateur Sports Competitions
 —International Cultural Exchange And Trade Fair Participation
 —International Atomic Energy Agency Participation
 —Cultural, Technical, And Educational Centers
 —Inter-American Cultural and Trade Center
 —International Cooperation in Health and Medical Research
 —International Travel
 —National Tourism Organization
 —Foreign Assistance
 —Mutual Educational and Cultural Exchange Program
 —The Peace Corps
 —Arms Control and Disarmament
 —Migration and Refugee Assistance
 —Foreign Gifts and Decorations
 —Department of State
 —Arms Export Control
 —International Expositions
 —Study Commission Relating to Foreign Policy
 —International Economic Policy
 —International Broadcasting
 —Japan-United States Friendship
 —Commission on Security and Cooperation in Europe
 —International Investment And Trade In Services Survey
 —Foreign Direct Investment And International Financial Data
 —Nuclear Non-Proliferation
 —Taiwan Relations
 —Support of Peace Treaty Between Egypt and Israel
 —Institute for Scientific and Technological Cooperation
 —Panama Canal
 —Foreign Service
 —Authorities Relating to the Regulation of Foreign Missions
 —Disposition of Personal Property Abroad
 —Foreign Relations of the United States Historical Series
 —Private Organization Assistance
 —Research and Training for Eastern Europe and Independent States of Former Soviet Union
 —United States Institute of Peace
 —United States Scholarship Program for Developing Countries
 —Diplomatic Security
 —Fascell Fellowship Program
 —Anti-Apartheid Program
 —Anti-Terrorism—PLO
 —International Financial Policy
 —Support for East European Democracy (SEED)
 —United States Response to Terrorism Affecting Americans Abroad
 —Control and Elimination of Chemical and Biological Weapons
 —United States-Hong Kong Policy
 —Freedom for Russia and Emerging Eurasian Democracies and Open Markets Support
 —Demilitarization of Former Soviet Union
 —Cooperative Threat Reduction with States of Former Soviet Union
 —Cuban Democracy
 —Cuban Liberty and Democratic Solidarity (Libertad)
 —Mansfield Fellowship Program
 —United States International Broadcasting
 —Nuclear Proliferation Prevention
 —International Religious Freedom
 —Foreign Affairs Agencies Consolidation
 —Chemical Weapons Convention Implementation
 —Assistance to Countries With Large Populations Having HIV/AIDS
 —United States-China Relations
 —Trafficking Victims Protection
 —Trade Sanctions Reform and Export Enhancement
 —Diplomatic Telecommunications Service Program Office (DTS-PO)
 —International Criminal Court
 —Afghanistan Freedom
 —United States Leadership Against HIV/AIDS, Tuberculosis, and Malaria
 —Millennium Challenge
 —North Korean Human Rights
 —Climate Change Technology Deployment in Developing Countries

External links
U.S. Code Title 22, via United States Government Printing Office
U.S. Code Title 22, via Cornell University

22
Title 22